is a shoot 'em up video game franchise developed and published by Taito. The eponymous first game was released in February 1987 for arcades, and has since been followed by six sequels and several spin-offs. The series takes place during the events of a war between humans and the Belsar empire, which plot to destroy all that is left of mankind. Darius is known for its branching stage paths, upbeat soundtrack, and cute sea life-inspired enemies.

Development

The series first appeared in Japanese game centers in 1987, where Darius became known for its "colossal" triple-screen arcade machine setup and body-sonic seats. It was known as the first arcade game to combine "high-impact engineering" with "creative presentation". Compared to the technology of Ultra Panavision 70 in how the series utilized color, it also used an "innovative" branching stage format that allowed for multiple playthroughs to be different in major ways. The series is also known for its cute graphics, upbeat soundtrack, and sound effects.

The series' use of robotic fish, crustaceans, and other sea creatures as enemies was cited as a way to make the games stand out due to the proliferation of sci-fi arcade shooters in the mid-1980s'.

List of games in the series

Arcade releases
Darius (1987)
Darius Extra Version (1987): An updated and rebalanced version of the above based on player feedback.
 Darius II (1989): Was released in both triple- and double-screen (more common) versions. An international version with various changes was released titled Sagaia; accordingly, this name is commonly associated with Darius II outside Japan.
 Darius Gaiden (1994): This game was originally announced as Darius III.
 G-Darius (1997)
G-Darius Ver.2 (1997): An updated and rebalanced version of the above. Not much is known about it, other than it being developed after the PlayStation port.
 Dariusburst Another Chronicle (2010): Related to the PSP Dariusburst.

Consumer releases

Original works
Darius Twin (1991): An original game for the Super Famicom/SNES. Gameplay is mostly based on Darius II.
Darius Force (1993): Another original game for the Super Famicom/SNES and followup to Twin. Again, gameplay is mostly based on Darius II.
Dariusburst (2009): Released for the PSP. Meant to be the follow up to G-Darius.

Ports and conversions
Darius+ (1989): Released for various Western home PCs like the Atari ST, the Amiga, and the ZX Spectrum. Based loosely on the original Darius.
Super Darius (1990): A conversion of Darius for the PC Engine's Super CD-ROM², very close to the original other than being single-screen. Features new bosses, as well as a "boss rush" mode.
Darius Alpha (1990): Released alongside Super Darius in an unknown manner; extremely rare. A conversion of the above's boss rush as a regular PC Engine HuCard, something of a demo for the later Darius Plus. Some bosses were removed.
Darius Plus (1990): The full game itself, again a PC Engine HuCard. The bosses that were removed in Alpha do not return here. Both Alpha and Plus were actually written for the PC Engine SuperGrafx and playing them on that console results in slightly improved graphics (less flicker and slowdown).
Darius II (1990): A conversion of Darius II for the Mega Drive. Some changes to bosses and levels even beyond having to rebalance levels for single-screen purposes. Has a secret boss rush mode itself. This port was released in the US, under the Sagaia name.
Sagaia (1991): A partly original game for the Game Boy. Something of a "special version" of Darius, like with Darius+. The total package is very similar to Nemesis.
Sagaia (1992): A Europe-only conversion of Darius II for the Master System, related to and based on the above Mega Drive version. Not to be confused with the above.
Super Darius II (1993): A conversion of Darius II for the PC Engine's Super CD-ROM² add-on. Essentially a remake: full arranges for every original song plus new songs entirely, a completely different set of bosses, otherwise redesigned zones and their enemies, etc.
Darius Gaiden (1995, 1996, 1998): A conversion of Darius Gaiden for Sega Saturn, PlayStation, and Windows, respectively. Fairly close to the original.
Darius II (1996): A conversion of Darius II for the Sega Saturn. Known for being very close to the original, even allowing for a simulated double-screen view.
G-Darius (1998, 2001): A port of G-Darius to PlayStation and Windows respectively. Near perfect, since the arcade version used PlayStation-based hardware itself; the Windows version is a direct port of this, even featuring PlayStation controller buttons. Includes features like boss rush, etc.
Darius R (2002): A semi-remake of Darius for Game Boy Advance. A mix of various other games in the series.
Darius Gate, Darius Ocean, Darius Wide, etc. (2002~2007): Various conversions of Darius (specifically Super/Plus) for mobile phone services like i-mode, Yahoo! Mobile, and EZ Appli.
Taito Memories and Taito Legends (2005~2006): Buried within this large series of compilations are ports of Darius II, Darius Gaiden, and G-Darius. 
Dariusburst Second Prologue (2012): A port of Dariusburst for iOS and Android OS devices. Contains a "remixed" version of the original among other things, such as content from Another Chronicle.
Dariusburst: Chronicle Saviours (2015): An enhanced version of Dariusburst for PlayStation 4, PlayStation Vita, and Microsoft Windows.

Related games
Syvalion (1988): Originally presented as a sequel to Darius. Music from the game appears in Dariusburst.
Metal Black (1991): Initially planned as Darius 3. Features a number of fish-based machines from Darius. It is a successor to Gun Frontier.
Border Down (2003): A successor to Metal Black developed by some members of the original team who started their own company, G.rev, to specifically make this game.

Notes

References

External links
 Official website

 
Horizontally scrolling shooters
Video game franchises introduced in 1987